Rahul is a 2001 Indian Hindi-language film directed by Prakash Jha and produced by Subhash Ghai. The film stars Neha Bajpai, Jatin Grewal, Rajeshwari Sachdev and Yash Pathak.

Synopsis
Mira comes from a wealthy family, however, she wants to marry Akash Sharma, who is less wealthy. Against the wishes of her mother and brother, Mira marries Akash. Akash and Mira start a life full of love. Once Rahul is born Mira's family forgives them. Akash has his own small business of travel. He is dedicated to working but would not earn money by cheating. On Rahul's first birthday Akash gives Mira the permission of inviting her family. At the venue, Mira's family comes along and Mira's brother Rohit insults Akash to the core. This infuriates Akash and he hits Rohit. Mira asks Akash to apologise to her brother, which the former refuses. Mira's family forcibly takes her away from Akash. She is also forced to leave behind her son Rahul. Akash and Mira get divorced in the court and fearing that Akash might take her life in absence of Rahul, Mira is forced to give the custody of her only child to Akash, until he is at least five years old.

Rahul, who had been so long living with his father misses his mother very much. His father has infiltrated the idea in him that his mother is very bad. However, he finds out from Uncle John that Mira is very good and that she lives in Mahabaleshwar with her parents. Rahul secretly goes and meets her, after which he finds out that his mother is very loving and caring towards him. Rahul and Mira continue to meet each other secretly. Meanwhile, Rahul often falls ill, which leads others including the family doctor to suggest that Akash goes for a second marriage with Sheila. Sheila cares for Rahul too. Akash initially refuses but eventually agrees for the sake of Rahul. Rahul likes Sheila but cannot take her to be his mother. Mira learns that Akash is preparing for a second marriage. Mira's family also wants her to marry Naveen.

One day, Akash finds out that Mira and Rahul are in touch. He forces the kid to tell Mira that he hates her. This creates a tremendous pressure on Rahul's mind who gets drenched in rain and falls sick. This leads Akash and Mira to come to the hospital and confront each other. Mira then realizes that her family had been selfish all along and that Akash was not at fault. After Rahul is treated, the two get united for the sake of Rahul.

Cast
 Yash Pathak as Rahul Sharma 
 Jatin Grewal as Akash Sharma, Rahul's father 
 Neha Bajpai as Mira Singh Sharma, Rahul's mother 
 Rajeshwari Sachdev as Sheila Singh, Rahul's teacher  
 Mahesh Thakur as Naveen Malhotra
 Gulshan Grover as Uncle John 
 Parikshat Sahni as Doctor Uncle 
 Manish Wadhwa as Rohit Singh, Mira’s brother 
 Neena Kulkarni as Mrs. Singh 
 Isha Koppikar as an item number (special appearance)
 Tanvi Hegde as Isha
 Rita Joshi
 Sudhir Mishra
 Vrajesh Hirjee as Isha's father
 Anil Nagrath

Soundtrack
The music is composed by Anu Malik while the lyrics are penned by Anand Bakshi.

Track listing

References

External links
 

2000s Hindi-language films
2001 films
Films directed by Prakash Jha
Indian drama films
Films scored by Anu Malik
2001 drama films
Hindi-language drama films